Gérard Hallet (born 4 March 1946, in Sézanne) is a retired French footballer. He played for Montluçon, Paris SG, Paris FC and Auxerre.

External links
 Player profile

1946 births
Living people
French footballers
Paris Saint-Germain F.C. players
Paris FC players
AJ Auxerre players
Ligue 1 players
Ligue 2 players
Olympic footballers of France
Footballers at the 1968 Summer Olympics
Competitors at the 1967 Mediterranean Games
Mediterranean Games gold medalists for France
Montluçon Football players
Association football midfielders
Mediterranean Games medalists in football